Nörvenich is a municipality in the district of Düren in the state of North Rhine-Westphalia, Germany.

See also 

Nörvenich Air Base

References

Düren (district)